Vlastimil Hoferek (born 6 November 1946 in Ostrava) is a Czech former sprint and hurdling athlete who specialised in the 110 metres hurdles and 60 metres hurdles. 
During his career in which he represented Czechoslovakia, Hoferek participated in four international athletics meetings, one Summer Universiade, two European Athletics Indoor Championships and European Athletics Championships in Rome. He is the 60 metres hurdles Czechoslovak Record Holder (7.7 seconds) and the Czechoslovak Indoor Champion from 1973.

Athletics career 

Hoferek started his athletics career under the coach Gibala in Trencin; in 1959 he continued in Ostrava-Poruba under the coach Frantisek Klusal and in 1964 he moved to Vitkovice athletics club in Ostrava where he trained under the coach Rudolf Chovanec. During his military service in 1966 - 1967 he trained in Banska Bystrica and thereafter he returned to Vitkovice club in Ostrava and run for the club until 1974. In 1972 he started to train with the coach Oto Svrsek and under Svrsek's leadership achieved his best results.

In 1973 Hoferek became the Czechoslovak Indoor Champion setting a national record of 7.7 s  in the 60 m hurdles which qualified him for the European Athletics Indoor Championships in Rotterdam. In the same year he also won a gold at the Czechoslovak Universiade running 14.2 s in the 110 m hurdles. In 1974 he collided with a press photographer during the final at the Czechoslovak Athletics Indoor Championship and missed his opportunity to defend his indoor champion title. At the European Indoor Championship in Göteborg he also missed qualifying for the final by one hundredth of a second and came ninth. At the European Athletics Championships in Rome in 1974 he came tenth running the 110 m hurdlers in 13.89 s setting his personal best. In the same year he was sharing 26th-34th position in the world athletics table.

In 1975 he was selected to prepare for the 1976 Summer Olympics in Montreal. Following the relegation of Vitkovice club he transferred to Trinec athletics club in the same year but due to protracted injury he ended his career in 1976.

Post-retirement career 
Since ending his active career in 1976 he continued to dedicate his free time to athletics and sport. During the years 1976 - 1991 he coached young athletes from Juvinelles and Juniors to Youth and the Under 21. Since 1982 till 2017 he was the chair of the regional athletics association of the Moravian-Silesian Region. During 1990-1992 he was the chair of the methodical committee and a member of VV ČAS (executive committee of Czechoslovak Athletics Association). He has been working as a track and field athletics official at both juvenile and international athletics events. Currently he is a member of supervisory committee for the Centre of Individual Sports in Ostrava.

Achievements

Personal Bests 
 100 metres - 10.5 sec 
 200 metres - 21.4 sec
 110 meters hurdles - 13.7 sec (electronically 13.89 sec)
 60 metres hurdlers - 7.7 (NR) (electronically 7.96 sec)

Literature 
 Malá encyklopedie atletiky - Jan Jirka, Jan Popper a kolektiv, Praha Olympia 1990, 1. vydání  
 Kdo byl kdo v české atletice - Jan Jirka a kol. Praha Olympia 2004,

External links 
 Results of European Athletics Indoor Championships in Rotterdam 1973
 Results of European Athletics Indoor Championships in Göteborg 1974
 Results of European Athletics Championships in Rome 1974
  Men's 110m hurdles - European Athletics Championships in Rome 1974 on youtube.com
 Historical tables of Czech athletics association
 Executive committee of MSKAS

References 

1946 births
Living people
Czech male hurdlers
Czech sprinters
Sportspeople from Ostrava